Alamabad (also Romanized as ‘Ālamābād, ‘Ālāmābād, and ‘Alemābād; also known as ‘Ālamābād-e Soflá) is a village in Silakhor Rural District, Silakhor District, Dorud County, Lorestan Province, Iran. At the 2006 census, its population was 392, in 99 families.

References 

Towns and villages in Dorud County